Tropiometra is a genus of crinoids in the monotypic family Tropiometridae.

Species
The following species are found in this genus:
Tropiometra afra (Hartlaub, 1890)
Tropiometra carinata (Lamarck, 1816)
Tropiometra macrodiscus (Hara, 1895)
Tropiometra magnifica AH Clark, 1936

References

Tropiometridae
Taxa named by Austin Hobart Clark